Sa'id ibn Makhlad (died 889) was a senior official of the Abbasid Caliphate. Born a Nestorian Christian, he converted to Islam and served as a secretary in the Abbasid capital, Baghdad. He rose to prominence during the regency of al-Muwaffaq over his brother, the Caliph al-Mu'tamid (r. 870–892): between 878 and 885, he served as de facto vizier of the Caliphate, although he did not bear the title. His valuable assistance to al-Muwaffaq was recognized in 882 by the award of the honorific title Dhu'l-wizaratayn ("possessor of the two vizierates"), with which he appears even on coins. However, the activities of his brother, Abdun, who had remained a Christian and tried to obtain concessions for the Christian subjects of the Caliphate, brought about his sudden fall from power in 885. He died in 889.

Sa'id has been erroneously considered by some writers as the brother of another Christian convert, al-Hasan ibn Makhlad al-Jarrah, who was his predecessor as vizier.

Sources
 

9th-century births
889 deaths
Viziers of the Abbasid Caliphate
Converts to Islam from Christianity
Nestorians in the Abbasid Caliphate

9th-century Arabs